Tereza Vanišová (born 30 January 1996) is a Czech ice hockey player and member of the Czech national ice hockey team, currently playing in the Premier Hockey Federation (PHF) with the Toronto Six. She was drafted in the second round, 12th overall by the Boston Pride in the 2020 NWHL Draft.

Playing career 

Across 129 NCAA games played with the Maine Black Bears women's ice hockey program, Vanisova put up 63 goals and 66 assists for 129 total points. She was named Hockey East Co-Rookie of the Year and the Czech Republic's Female Hockey Player of the Year in 2016–17. The next year she would be named a Hockey East All-Conference Second Team. As of 2021, Vanišová holds the Maine Black Bears women's ice hockey program's all-time career scoring record. She has been noted for her quick and creative playing style.

International 

She represented the Czech Republic at the IIHF Women's World Championship in 2016, 2017, 2019, and 2021. With the Czech national under-18 team, she participated in the IIHF U18 Women's World Championships in 2012, 2013, and 2014.

References

External links
 
 

1996 births
Living people
Boston Pride players
Czech expatriate ice hockey players in Canada
Czech expatriate ice hockey players in Sweden
Czech expatriate ice hockey players in the United States
Czech women's ice hockey forwards
Ice hockey players at the 2022 Winter Olympics
Isobel Cup champions
Leksands IF Dam players
Maine Black Bears women's ice hockey players
Olympic ice hockey players of the Czech Republic
People from Strakonice
Sportspeople from the South Bohemian Region
Toronto Six players